Cristian Andrés Olivares Cifuentes (born 19 September 1980) is a Chilean former professional footballer who played as a defender.

Club career
As a youth player, Olivares was with a Cobresal Academy based in Maipú from 1993 to 1998. He made his professional debut playing for Universidad de Concepción, staying at the club until 2004, with a stint on loan at Fernández Vial in the last year.

In Chile, he also played for Palestino, Ñublense, Rangers, Unión San Felipe, Deportes Melipilla, Coquimbo Unido and San Antonio Unido, what was his last club in the Segunda División Profesional, becoming the team captain.

Although he didn't win any league titles, he got promotion to the Chilean Primera División four times along with Universidad de Concepción in 2002, Ñublense in 2006 and Rangers in both 2007 and 2011. In addition, along with Universidad de Concepción he qualified to the 2004 Copa Libertadores.

Abroad, he had a stint with Villa Española in the Uruguayan Primera División on second half 2008.

Coaching career
Following his retirement as a football player, he worked as coach for the Universidad de Chile youth ranks on second half 2013.

He also led the Universidad Católica Academy based in Chiguayante and has worked for other institutions such as Club de Campo Bellavista and Federico Santa María Technical University.

References

External links
 
 Cristian Olivares at PlaymakerStats.com
 
 Cristian Olivares at Clubdeportivo.udec.cl 

1980 births
Living people
Footballers from Santiago
Chilean footballers
Chilean expatriate footballers
Universidad de Concepción footballers
C.D. Arturo Fernández Vial footballers
Club Deportivo Palestino footballers
Ñublense footballers
Rangers de Talca footballers
Unión San Felipe footballers
C.S.D. Villa Española players
Villa Española players
Deportes Melipilla footballers
Coquimbo Unido footballers
San Antonio Unido footballers
Primera B de Chile players
Chilean Primera División players
Uruguayan Primera División players
Segunda División Profesional de Chile players
Chilean expatriate sportspeople in Uruguay
Expatriate footballers in Uruguay
Association football defenders
Chilean football managers